The Get Down (Original Soundtrack from the Netflix Original Series) is the official soundtrack for the first part of the TV series The Get Down featuring various artists, released by RCA Records on August 12, 2016.

Track listing

Standard version

Deluxe version

Charts

References

2016 soundtrack albums
Disco soundtracks
Hip hop soundtracks
RCA Records compilation albums
Television soundtracks